Yuliya Shvayger (born 20 October 1994) is an Israeli chess player. She was awarded the titles of International Master (IM) and Woman Grandmaster (WGM) by FIDE in 2017. 

Originally from Ukraine, Shvayger switched her national federation to Israel in 2012. Since then she has played on the Israeli team at the Women's Chess Olympiad, where in 2016 at the 42nd Chess Olympiad the team, with Shvayger playing at the first board, reached the ninth place in the final ranking. She also played with Israel at the Women's European Team Chess Championship, where in 2013 she won the individual bronze medal on board four. Shvayger competed in the Women's World Chess Championship tournament in 2018. She was knocked out by Monika Soćko in the first round after losing by a score of ½–1½. The following month, Shvayger won the Israeli women's championship edging out Marsel Efroimski on tiebreak, after both players scored 7 points.

References

External links
 
 

1994 births
Living people
Chess International Masters
Chess woman grandmasters
Israeli female chess players
Ukrainian female chess players
Chess Olympiad competitors
Ukrainian emigrants to Israel
Sportspeople from Vinnytsia